Honorary citizen of Novi Sad is a title awarded by the leadership of Novi Sad on behalf of the city.

Requirements
The title can be awarded to both a citizen of Serbia and any other state, as a politician or statesman, as well as a representative of a non-governmental organization or an artist. A candidate for honorary citizenship of Novi Sad must have a contribution to the development of science, art, humanitarian activities, etc., which has helped the development and image of Belgrade, the development of democracy in Serbia and the world. The decision to award the title is made by the City Assembly.

A person who has received the title of honorary citizen of Novi Sad is presented with an official letter on official paper at an official meeting of the Assembly. An honorary citizen is given the city symbol in the form of a gilded key with the emblem of Novi Sad.

History
The first honorary citizen of Novi Sad was Nikola Tesla by the decision of the Assembly of the city on 10 July 1936. He was awarded this title due to the 80th anniversary of his birth, his worldwide contributions in the fields of physics and engineering, and bringing glory to the Serbian people and the people of the Kingdom of Yugoslavia. After World War II, the second honorary citizen was Josip Vidmar in 1970.

On 16 October 1992 (the year when the title was officially established), the Assembly of Novi Sad made the decision where the title of honorary citizen is given to any prominent figures from the country and abroad who, through their work in establishing and developing co-operation with Novi Sad, have made a significant contribution to the city's interests and needs.

Since its existence, most people given the title of honorary citizen are humanitarians.

List of honorary citizens
The list includes people who have been awarded the title of honorary citizen of Novi Sad.

See also
List of people from Novi Sad
List of honorary citizens of Belgrade
List of honorary citizens of Niš
List of honorary citizens of Zrenjanin

References 

Novi Sad

Novi Sad-related lists
Honorary citizens of Novi Sad